Fuxing Road (also called 11th Ave.) is a major arterial in Taipei connecting the Daan District and the National Taiwan University in the south with the Zhongzheng, Zhongshan, and Songshan districts around the northern terminus.  Most of the Taipei Metro's Wenshan Line runs above Fuxing Road, with provisions along the road for the line's extension to Neihu.  In November 2006, Taipei City opened up a new section of Fuxing Road between Minzu E. Road and the Dazhi Bridge, providing people a new connection between Dazhi and central Taipei without having to drive around Songshan Airport.  The new connection is a four-lane tunnel travelling under Songshan Airport and is restricted to motorized vehicles only.  Fuxing Road is divided into north and south sections by Zhongxiao E. Road, as is with most north–south arterials in Taipei.  The southern section is divided into two numbered sections, while surprisingly, the northern section is not divided into numbered sections.  Fuxing Road is also known for the many elaborate shopping malls located along the road, such as the Taipei SOGO, the Breeze Center, the Sunrise Department Store, and many more.

Major Intersections

Fuxing North Road 
 Minzu East Road (10th Blvd)
 Minquan East Road (9th Blvd)
 Minsheng East Road (8th Blvd)
 Nanjing East Road (7th Blvd)
 Changan East Road (6th Blvd)

Fuxing South Road 
 Zhongxiao East Road (4th Blvd)
 Renai Road (3rd Blvd)
 Xinyi Road (2nd Blvd)
 Heping Road (1st Blvd)
 Xinhai Road/Xinhai Freeway

See also
 List of roads in Taiwan

Streets in Taipei